The Montgomery bus boycott was a political and social protest campaign against the policy of racial segregation on the public transit system of Montgomery, Alabama. It was a foundational event in the civil rights movement in the United States. The campaign lasted from December 5, 1955—the Monday after Rosa Parks, an African-American woman, was arrested for her refusal to surrender her seat to a white person—to December 20, 1956, when the federal ruling Browder v. Gayle took effect, and led to a United States Supreme Court decision that declared the Alabama and Montgomery laws that segregated buses were unconstitutional.

Background

Before the bus boycott, Jim Crow laws mandated the racial segregation of the Montgomery Bus Line. As a result of this segregation, African Americans were not hired as drivers, were forced to ride in the back of the bus, and were frequently ordered to surrender their seats to white people even though black passengers made up 75% of the bus system's riders. Many bus drivers treated their black passengers poorly beyond the law: African-Americans were assaulted, shortchanged, and left stranded after paying their fares.

The year before the bus boycott began, the Supreme Court decided unanimously, in the case of Brown v. Board of Education, that racial segregation in schools was unconstitutional. The reaction by the white population of the Deep South was "noisy and stubborn". Many white bus drivers joined the White Citizens' Council as a result of the decision.

Although it is often framed as the start of the civil rights movement, the boycott occurred at the end of many black communities' struggles in the South to protect black women, such as Recy Taylor, from racial violence. The boycott also took place within a larger statewide and national movement for civil rights, including court cases such as Morgan v. Virginia, the earlier Baton Rouge bus boycott, and the arrest of Claudette Colvin for refusing to give up her seat on a Montgomery bus.

Previous transport and Bus boycotts in the United States 

In 1841 Frederick Douglass and his friend James N. Buffum entered a train car reserved for white passengers in Lynn, Massachusetts, when the conductor ordered them to leave the car, they refused. Following the action, widespread organizing led Congress to approve the Civil Rights Act of 1875 which grant equal rights to Black citizens in public accommodations. In 1883 the Supreme Court overturned this victory declaring it unconstitutional.

Rape of Recy Taylor 

On September 3, 1944, Recy Taylor, a black woman, was raped by six white men in Abbeville, Alabama. After investigating her case, Rosa Parksalong with E. D. Nixon, Rufus A. Lewis, and E. G. Jacksonorganized a defense for Taylor in Montgomery. They mobilized nationwide support from labor unions, African-American organizations, and women's groups to form the Alabama Committee for Equal Justice for Mrs. Recy Taylor. Although they did not succeed in obtaining justice in court for Taylor, the mobilization of the black community in Alabama set up social and political networks that enabled the success of the Montgomery bus boycott a decade later.

Morgan v. Virginia decision

The National Association for the Advancement of Colored People (NAACP) had accepted and litigated other cases, including that of Irene Morgan in 1946, which resulted in a victory in the Supreme Court on the grounds that segregated interstate bus lines violated the Commerce Clause. That victory, however, overturned state segregation laws only insofar as they applied to travel in interstate commerce, such as interstate bus travel, and Southern bus companies immediately circumvented the Morgan ruling by instituting their own Jim Crow regulations. Further incidents continued to take place in Montgomery, including the arrest of Lillie Mae Bradford for disorderly conduct in May 1951 for allegedly refusing to leave the white passengers' section until the bus driver amended an incorrect charge on her transfer ticket.

Baton Rouge bus boycott

On February 25, 1953, the Baton Rouge, Louisiana, city-parish council passed Ordinance 222 after the city saw protesting from African Americans when the council raised the city's bus fares. The ordinance abolished race-based reserved seating requirements and allowed the admission of African Americans in the front sections of city buses if there were no white passengers present, but it still required African Americans to enter from the rear rather than the front of the buses. However, the ordinance was largely unenforced by the city bus drivers. The drivers later went on strike after city authorities refused to arrest Rev. T. J. Jemison for sitting in a front row. Four days after the strike began, Louisiana Attorney General and former Baton Rouge mayor Fred S. LeBlanc declared the ordinance unconstitutional under Louisiana state law. This led Rev. Jemison to organize what historians believe to be the first bus boycott of the civil rights movement. The boycott ended after eight days when an agreement was reached to only retain the first two front and back rows as racially reserved seating.

Arrest of Claudette Colvin

Black activists had begun to build a case to challenge state bus segregation laws around the arrest of 15-year-old Claudette Colvin, a student at Booker T. Washington High School in Montgomery. On March 2, 1955, Colvin was handcuffed, arrested, and forcibly removed from a public bus when she refused to give up her seat to a white man. At the time, Colvin was an active member in the NAACP Youth Council, where Rosa Parks was an advisor. Colvin's legal case formed the core of Browder v. Gayle, which ended the Montgomery bus boycott when the Supreme Court ruled on it in December 1956.

Murder of Emmett Till; trial and acquittal of the accused 

In August 1955, four months before Parks's refusal to give up a seat on the bus that led to the Montgomery bus boycott, a 14-year-old African American from Chicago named Emmett Till was murdered by two white men, John W. Milam and Roy Bryant. The picture of his brutally beaten body in the open-casket funeral that his mother requested was widely publicized, specifically by the weekly newspaper Jet, which circulated in much of the black community in the North. His accused killers were acquitted the following month. There was massive outrage at this verdict both domestically and internationally. In an interview on January 24, 1956, published in Look magazine, the two men admitted to murdering Till.

Keys v. Carolina Coach Co. decision

In November 1955, three weeks before Parks's defiance of Jim Crow laws in Montgomery, the Interstate Commerce Commission (ICC), in response to a complaint filed by Women's Army Corps Private Sarah Keys, closed the legal loophole left by the Morgan ruling in a landmark case known as Keys v. Carolina Coach Co.. The ICC prohibited individual carriers from imposing their own segregation rules on interstate travelers, declaring that to do so was a violation of the anti-discrimination provision of the Interstate Commerce Act. However, neither the Supreme Court's Morgan ruling nor the ICC's Keys ruling addressed the matter of Jim Crow travel within the individual states.

History
Under the system of segregation used on Montgomery buses, the ten front seats were reserved for white people at all times. The ten back seats were supposed to be reserved for black people at all times. The middle section of the bus consisted of sixteen unreserved seats for white and black people on a segregated basis. White people filled the middle seats from the front to back, and black people filled seats from the back to front until the bus was full. If other black people boarded the bus, they were required to stand. If another white person boarded the bus, then everyone in the black row nearest the front had to get up and stand so that a new row for white people could be created; it was illegal for white and black people to sit next to each other. When Rosa Parks refused to give up her seat for a white person, she was sitting in the first row of the middle section.

Often when boarding the buses, black people were required to pay at the front, get off, and reenter the bus through a separate door at the back. Occasionally, bus drivers would drive away before black passengers were able to reboard. National City Lines owned the Montgomery Bus Line at the time of the Montgomery bus boycott. Under the leadership of Walter Reuther, the United Auto Workers donated almost $5,000 to the boycott's organizing committee.

Rosa Parks

Rosa Parks (February 4, 1913 – October 24, 2005) was a seamstress by profession; she was also the secretary for the Montgomery chapter of the NAACP. Twelve years before her history-making arrest, Parks was stopped from boarding a city bus by driver James F. Blake, who ordered her to board at the rear door and then drove off without her. Parks vowed never again to ride a bus driven by Blake. As a member of the NAACP, Parks was an investigator assigned to cases of sexual assault. In 1945, she was sent to Abbeville, Alabama, to investigate the gang rape of Recy Taylor. The protest that arose around the Taylor case was the first instance of a nationwide civil rights protest, and it laid the groundwork for the Montgomery bus boycott.

In 1955, Parks completed a course in "Race Relations" at the Highlander Folk School in Tennessee, where nonviolent civil disobedience had been discussed as a tactic. On December 1, 1955, Parks was sitting in the foremost row in which black people could sit (in the middle section). When a white man boarded the bus, the bus driver told everyone in her row to move back. At that moment, Parks realized that she was again on a bus driven by Blake. While all of the other black people in her row complied, Parks refused, and she was arrested for failing to obey the driver's seat assignments, as city ordinances did not explicitly mandate segregation but did give the bus driver authority to assign seats. Found guilty on December 5, Parks was fined $10 plus a court cost of $4 (combined total ), and she appealed.  This movement also sparked riots leading up to the 1956 Sugar Bowl.

E. D. Nixon
Some action against segregation had been in the works for some time before Parks' arrest, under the leadership of E. D. Nixon, president of the local NAACP chapter and a member of the Brotherhood of Sleeping Car Porters. Nixon intended that her arrest be a test case to allow Montgomery's black citizens to challenge segregation on the city's public buses. With this goal, community leaders had been waiting for the right person to be arrested, a person who would anger the black community into action, who would agree to test the segregation laws in court, and who, most importantly, was "above reproach". When Colvin was arrested in March 1955, Nixon thought he had found the perfect person, but the teenager turned out to be pregnant. Nixon later explained, "I had to be sure that I had somebody I could win with." Parks was a good candidate because of her employment and marital status, along with her good standing in the community.

Between Parks' arrest and trial, Nixon organized a meeting of local ministers at Martin Luther King Jr.'s church. Though Nixon could not attend the meeting because of his work schedule, he arranged that no election of a leader for the proposed boycott would take place until his return. When he returned, he caucused with Ralph Abernathy and Rev. E.N. French to name the association to lead the boycott to the city (they selected the "Montgomery Improvement Association", "MIA"), and they selected King (Nixon's choice) to lead the boycott. Nixon wanted King to lead the boycott because the young minister was new to Montgomery and the city fathers had not had time to intimidate him. At a subsequent, larger meeting of ministers, Nixon's agenda was threatened by the clergymen's reluctance to support the campaign. Nixon was indignant, pointing out that their poor congregations worked to put money into the collection plates so these ministers could live well, and when those congregations needed the clergy to stand up for them, those comfortable ministers refused to do so.  Nixon threatened to reveal the ministers' cowardice to the black community, and King spoke up, denying he was afraid to support the boycott. King agreed to lead the MIA, and Nixon was elected its treasurer.

Boycott

On the night of Parks' arrest, the Women's Political Council, led by Jo Ann Robinson, printed and circulated a flyer throughout Montgomery's black community that read as follows:

Another woman has been arrested and thrown in jail because she refused to get up out of her seat on the bus for a white person to sit down. It is the second time since the Claudette Colvin case that a Negro woman has been arrested for the same thing. This has to be stopped. Negroes have rights too, for if Negroes did not ride the buses, they could not operate. Three-fourths of the riders are Negro, yet we are arrested, or have to stand over empty seats. If we do not do something to stop these arrests, they will continue. The next time it may be you, or your daughter, or mother. This woman's case will come up on Monday. We are, therefore, asking every Negro to stay off the buses Monday in protest of the arrest and trial. Don't ride the buses to work, to town, to school, or anywhere on Monday. You can afford to stay out of school for one day if you have no other way to go except by bus. You can also afford to stay out of town for one day. If you work, take a cab, or walk. But please, children and grown-ups, don't ride the bus at all on Monday. Please stay off all buses Monday.

The next morning there was a meeting led by the new Montgomery Improvement Association (MIA) head, King, where a group of 16 to 18 people gathered at the Mt. Zion Church to discuss boycott strategies. At that time Rosa Parks was introduced but not asked to speak, despite a standing ovation and calls from the crowd for her to speak; she asked someone if she should say something, but they replied, "Why, you've said enough." A citywide boycott of public transit was proposed, with three demands: 1) courteous treatment by bus operators, 2) passengers seated on a first-come, first-served basis, with black people seated in the back half and white people seated in the front half, and 3) black people would be employed as bus operators on routes predominately taken by black people.

This demand was a compromise for the leaders of the boycott, who believed that the city of Montgomery would be more likely to accept it rather than a demand for full integration of the buses. In this respect, the MIA leaders followed the pattern of 1950s boycott campaigns in the Deep South, including the successful boycott a few years earlier of service stations in Mississippi for refusing to provide restrooms for Black people. The organizer of that campaign, T. R. M. Howard of the Regional Council of Negro Leadership, had spoken on the lynching of Emmett Till as King's guest at the Dexter Avenue Baptist Church only four days before Parks's arrest. Parks was in the audience and later said that Emmett Till was on her mind when she refused to give up her seat.

The MIA's demand for a fixed dividing line was to be supplemented by a requirement that all bus passengers receive courteous treatment by bus operators, be seated on a first-come, first-served basis, and that Black people be employed as bus drivers. The proposal was passed, and the boycott was to commence the following Monday. To publicize the impending boycott it was advertised at black churches throughout Montgomery the following Sunday.

On Saturday, December 3, it was evident that the black community would support the boycott, and very few Black people rode the buses that day. On December 5, a mass meeting was held at the Holt Street Baptist Church to determine if the protest would continue.  Given twenty minutes notice, King gave a speech asking for a bus boycott and attendees enthusiastically agreed. Starting December 7, J Edgar Hoover's FBI noted the "agitation among negroes" and tried to find "derogatory information" about King.

The boycott proved extremely effective, with enough riders lost to the city transit system to cause serious economic distress. Martin Luther King later wrote, "[a] miracle had taken place." Instead of riding buses, boycotters organized a system of carpools, with car owners volunteering their vehicles or themselves driving people to various destinations. Some white housewives also drove their black domestic servants to work. When the city pressured local insurance companies to stop insuring cars used in the carpools, the boycott leaders arranged policies at Lloyd's of London.

Black taxi drivers charged ten cents per ride, a fare equal to the cost to ride the bus, in support of the boycott.  When word of this reached city officials on December 8, the order went out to fine any cab driver who charged a rider less than 45 cents. In addition to using private motor vehicles, some people used non-motorized means to get around, such as cycling, walking, or even riding mules or driving horse-drawn buggies. Some people also hitchhiked. During rush hours, sidewalks were often crowded. As the buses received few, if any, passengers, their officials asked the City Commission to allow stopping service to black communities.  Across the nation, black churches raised money to support the boycott and collected new and slightly used shoes to replace the tattered footwear of Montgomery's black citizens, many of whom walked everywhere rather than ride the buses and submit to Jim Crow laws.

In response, opposing whites swelled the ranks of the White Citizens' Council, the membership of which doubled during the course of the boycott. The councils sometimes resorted to violence: King's and Abernathy's houses were firebombed, as were four black Baptist churches. Boycotters were often physically attacked. After the attack at King's house, he gave a speech to the 300 angry African Americans who had gathered outside. He said:

King and 88 other boycott leaders and carpool drivers were indicted for conspiring to interfere with a business under a 1921 ordinance. Rather than wait to be arrested, they turned themselves in as an act of defiance.

King was ordered to pay a $500 fine or serve 386 days in jail. He ended up spending two weeks in jail. The move backfired by bringing national attention to the protest. King commented on the arrest by saying: "I was proud of my crime. It was the crime of joining my people in a nonviolent protest against injustice."

Also important during the bus boycott were grassroots activist groups that helped to catalyze both fund-raising and morale. Groups such as the Club from Nowhere helped to sustain the boycott by finding new ways of raising money and offering support to boycott participants.  Many members of these organizations were women and their contributions to the effort have been described by some as essential to the success of the bus boycott.

Victory

Pressure increased across the country. The related civil suit was heard in federal district court and, on June 5, 1956, the court ruled in Browder v. Gayle (1956) that Alabama's racial segregation laws for buses were unconstitutional. As the state appealed the decision, the boycott continued. The case moved on to the United States Supreme Court. On November 13, 1956, the Supreme Court upheld the district court's ruling.

The bus boycott officially ended on December 20, 1956, after 382 days. The Montgomery bus boycott resounded far beyond the desegregation of public buses. It stimulated activism and participation from the South in the national Civil Rights Movement and gave King national attention as a rising leader.

Aftermath 
White backlash against the court victory was quick, brutal, and, in the short term, effective.  Two days after the inauguration of desegregated seating, someone fired a shotgun through the front door of Martin Luther King's home. A day later, on Christmas Eve, white men attacked a black teenager as she exited a bus. Four days after that, two buses were fired upon by snipers. In one sniper incident, a pregnant woman was shot in both legs. On January 10, 1957, bombs destroyed five black churches and the home of Reverend Robert S. Graetz, one of the few white Montgomerians who had publicly sided with the MIA.

The City suspended bus service for several weeks on account of the violence. According to legal historian Randall Kennedy, "When the violence subsided and service was restored, many black Montgomerians enjoyed their newly recognized right only abstractly ... In practically every other setting, Montgomery remained overwhelmingly segregated ..." On January 23, a group of Klansmen (who would later be charged for the bombings) lynched a black man, Willie Edwards, on the pretext that he was dating a white woman.

The city's elite moved to strengthen segregation in other areas, and in March 1957 passed an ordinance making it "unlawful for white and colored persons to play together, or, in company with each other ... in any game of cards, dice, dominoes, checkers, pool, billiards, softball, basketball, baseball, football, golf, track, and at swimming pools, beaches, lakes or ponds or any other game or games or athletic contests, either indoors or outdoors."

Later in the year, Montgomery police charged seven Klansmen with the bombings, but all of the defendants were acquitted.  About the same time, the Alabama Supreme Court ruled against Martin Luther King's appeal of his "illegal boycott" conviction.  Rosa Parks left Montgomery due to death threats and employment blacklisting.  According to Charles Silberman, "by 1963, most Negroes in Montgomery had returned to the old custom of riding in the back of the bus."

The National Memorial for Peace and Justice contains, among other things, a sculpture "dedicated to the women who sustained the Montgomery Bus Boycott", by Dana King, to help illustrate the civil rights period. The memorial opened in downtown Montgomery, Alabama on April 26, 2018.

Participants

People

 Ralph Abernathy
 Hugo Black
 James F. Blake
 Aurelia Browder
 Mary Fair Burks
 Johnnie Carr
 Claudette Colvin
 Clifford Durr
 Mildred Fahrni
 Georgia Gilmore
 Robert Graetz
 Fred Gray
 Grover C. Hall Jr.
 Coretta Scott King
 Martin Luther King Jr.
 Theodora Lacey
 Edgar Nixon
 Rosa Parks
 Mother Pollard
 Jo Ann Robinson
 Bayard Rustin
 Nate Singleton
 Glenn Smiley
 Mary Louise Smith

Organizations

 Committee for Nonviolent Integration
 Fellowship of Reconciliation
 Georgia Gilmore
 Men of Montgomery
 Montgomery Improvement Association
 National Association for the Advancement of Colored People
 Women's Political Council

See also

 1957 Alexandra Bus Boycott
 Boycott (2001 film)
 Bristol Bus Boycott, 1963
 The Legacy Museum
 The Long Walk Home (1990 film)
 Martin Luther King and the Montgomery Story
 Rosa Parks Act
 Rosa Parks Museum

References

Further reading

 Berg, Allison, "Trauma and Testimony in Black Women's Civil Rights Memoirs: The Montgomery Bus Boycott and the Women Who Started It, Warriors Don't Cry, and From the Mississippi Delta', Journal of Women's History, 21 (Fall 2009), 84–107.
 Branch, Taylor. Parting The Waters: America In The King Years, 1954-63 (1988; New York: Simon & Schuster/Touchstone, 1989). 
 Carson, Clayborne, et al., editors, Eyes on The Prize Civil Rights Reader: documents, speeches, and first hand accounts from the black freedom struggle (New York:Penguin Books, 1991). 
 Freedman, Russell, "Freedom Walkers: The Story of the Montgomery Bus Boycott"
 Garrow, David J. Bearing the Cross: Martin Luther King Jr. and the Southern Christian Leadership Conference. (1986) 
 Garrow, David J., editor, The Montgomery Bus Boycott and the Women Who Started It: The Memoir of Jo Ann Gibson Robinson (Knoxville: The University of Tennessee Press, 1987).  
 King, Martin Luther, Jr., Stride Toward Freedom.  
 Morris, Aldon D., The Origins Of The Civil Rights Movement: Black Communities Organizing For Change (New York: The Free Press, 1984).  
 
 Raines, Howell, My Soul Is Rested: The Story Of The Civil Rights Movement In The Deep South.  
 Robnett, Belinda. How Long? How Long?: African American Women in the Struggle for Civil Rights. Oxford University Press. (1997) 
 Thornton III, J. Mills.  "Challenge and Response in the Montgomery Bus Boycott of 1955–1956." Alabama Review 67.1 (2014): 40–112.
 Thornton III, J. Mills.  Dividing Lines: Municipal Politics and the Struggle for Civil Rights in Montgomery, Birmingham, and Selma (2002)  excerpt
 Walsh, Frank, Landmark Events in American History: The Montgomery Bus Boycott. Williams, Juan, Eyes on The Prize: America's Civil Rights Years, 1954-1965 (New York: Penguin Books, 1988).  

External links

 Alabama Civil Rights Collection – Jack Rabin Collection on Alabama Civil Rights and Southern Activists, at Pennsylvania State University, includes oral history interviews and materials concerning Montgomery Bus Boycott
 Montgomery Bus Boycott article, Encyclopedia of Alabama
 Montgomery Bus Boycott – Story of Montgomery Bus Boycott
 Encyclopedia entry on the Montgomery Bus Boycott – Includes cross-referenced text, historical documents and streaming audio, presented by the King Research Institute at Stanford University
  The Montgomery Bus Boycott – African-American History
 Montgomery Bus Boycott – Civil Rights Movement Archive
 Learning From Rosa Parks, The Indypendent
  Montgomery Bus Boycott – Presented by the Montgomery Advertiser 
 Civil Rights Era Mug Shots, Montgomery County Sheriff's Office, Alabama Department of Archives & History
 Martin Luther King and the "Montgomery Story" Comic Book – 1956
 Montgomery Bus Boycott Documents Online collection of original boycott documents and articles by participants – Civil Rights Movement Archive.
 Montgomery Bus Boycott, Civil Rights Digital Library.
 The Boycott, The Rebellious Life of Mrs. Rosa Parks.''

 
1955 protests
1956 protests
Civil rights protests in the United States
Boycotts of organizations  
Conflicts in 1955
Civil rights movement
1955 in the United States
Bus Boycott
History of racism in Alabama
Martin Luther King Jr.
African-American history of Alabama
1955 in Alabama
1956 in Alabama
Transportation in Montgomery, Alabama
Protests in Alabama
1955 in transport
1956 in transport
Bus transportation in Alabama
Boycotts
December 1955 events in the United States